Nariman Bomanshaw Mehta (April 20, 1920 – August 22, 2014) was an Indian-born American organic chemist and pharmacologist who designed, synthesized, and patented the organic compound bupropion, marketed under the name Wellbutrin as an antidepressant and smoking cessation aid.

Early life and education
Mehta was born in Bombay, India into a Parsi Zoroastrian family. He attended St. Xavier's College in Bombay, from where he received Bachelor of Science degrees in chemistry and physics and  Bachelor of Arts degrees in English and economics, and a Master of Science degree. In 1939, he and fellow student Kaikhosrov D. Irani, later a noted academic in his own right, wrote and published the book "Textbook of Theoretical and Practical Physics".

Mehta won a Tata Scholarship and received a grant from Wendell Willkie. In 1947 Mehta went to the United States, where he earned a PhD in chemistry from The University of Kansas. Mehta's 1952 dissertation was titled I. Use of the Hammett equation in the prediction of product ratios in the Schmidt reaction of unsymmetrical diarylethylenes: II. The synthesis of possible emetine intermediates.

He had two daughters and a son.

Career
Seagram invited Mehta to the United States as a trainee in their research lab where he learned about fermentation and distillation. During his time at Seagram, Mehta studied the antibiotic Penicillin. While teaching chemistry at Central State University, Wilberforce, Ohio, Mehta joined the pharmaceutical company Burroughs Wellcome, Inc., now GlaxoSmithKline, where he worked on potential neuropsychopharmacological drugs and designed, synthesized, and patented (in 1969) the compound Bupropion (BW 323U66) that was approved for use as an antidepressant in 1985 and sold under the trade name Wellbutrin. Another application of the drug was as a smoking cessation aid.

Selected publications

Notes

References
 
 
 

1920 births
2014 deaths
20th-century Indian inventors
Indian pharmacologists
Indian emigrants to the United States
Indian biochemists
GSK plc
St. Xavier's College, Mumbai alumni
University of Kansas alumni
20th-century Indian chemists
Scientists from Mumbai
American people of Parsi descent
Parsi people from Mumbai
Parsi people